The Association Internationale pour les Technologies Objets, also known as AITO, is a non-profit association to promote the advancement of research in object-oriented technology.  Each year it awards the Dahl–Nygaard Prizes and beginning in 2016, The AITO Test of Time Award.   It published The Journal of Object Technology. and is the official sponsor of the annual European Conference on Object-Oriented Programming.

References

External links

Computer science-related professional associations
International learned societies
Dahl–Nygaard Prize